James Robert Atlas (March 22, 1949 – September 4, 2019) was a writer, especially of biographies, as well as a publisher. He was the president of Atlas & Company and founding editor of the Penguin Lives Series.

Early life and education 
Atlas was born in Evanston, Illinois to Donald and Nora (Glassenberg) Atlas. His father was a physician and his mother was a homemaker. Atlas graduated in 1967 from high school in Evanston, during the turmoil of the 1960s.

He studied at Harvard under Robert Lowell and Elizabeth Bishop with the intention of becoming a poet.  He went to Oxford and studied under the biographer Richard Ellmann, as a  Rhodes Scholar. During his time at Oxford he was inspired to become a biographer.

Career 
Atlas was a contributor to The New Yorker, and he was an editor at The New York Times Magazine for many years.  He edited volumes of poetry and wrote several novels and two biographies. In 2002, he started Atlas Books, which at one time published two series in conjunction with HarperCollins and W.W. Norton. In 2007, the company was renamed Atlas & Company, to coincide with the launch of its new list. Atlas joined Amazon Publishing and Atlas & Company stopped publishing new titles in 2012.

Atlas's work appeared in The New York Times Book Review, The New York Review of Books, The London Review of Books, Vanity Fair, Harper's, New York Magazine, and Huffington Post.

Personal life and death 
In 1975 he married psychiatrist Dr. Anna Fels. Atlas died in Manhattan, New York on September 4, 2019, from complications of a lung condition. He was survived by his wife and a son, daughter, and grandson.

Works
Ten American Poets: An Anthology of Poems, Cheadle: Carcanet Press, 1973
Delmore Schwartz: The Life of an American Poet, New York: Farrar Straus Giroux, 1977 (nominated for the National Book Award)
Battle of the Books: The Curriculum Debate in America, New York: W.W. Norton, 1993
Bellow: A Biography, New York: Random House and London: Faber, 2000 (He is also the editor of Saul Bellow's collection of novels in Library of America)
My Life in the Middle Ages: A Survivor's Tale, New York: HarperCollins, 2005 (An adaptation of a series of articles he did for The New Yorker, and The Great Pretender, a semi-autobiographical novel about coming of age in the 1960s. He is a longtime board member of the Harvard Advocate, which has previously published his work).
, (editor) regarding some global views of America.
The Shadow in the Garden: A Biographer's Tale, New York: Pantheon Books, 2017

References

External links
 New York Observer article mentions Atlas' postponement of spring 2009 list
 Publishers Weekly article, "Atlas Books Starts New Line,"
 Atlas & Co.
 

1949 births
2019 deaths
American Rhodes Scholars
American book publishers (people)
Harvard University alumni
Evanston Township High School alumni
21st-century American male writers
21st-century American biographers
Writers from Evanston, Illinois
The New Yorker people
20th-century American biographers
20th-century American journalists
American male journalists
20th-century American male writers
American male non-fiction writers